Tod Papageorge (born in Portsmouth, New Hampshire United States, 1940) is an American photographer whose career began in the New York City street photography movement of the 1960s. He is the recipient of two Guggenheim fellowships and two NEA Visual Artists Fellowships. His work is in public collections including the Museum of Modern Art and the Art Institute of Chicago. Between 1979 and 2013 he directed the graduate program in photography at the Yale School of Art.

Life and work
Papageorge started taking photographs in 1962 as an English literature major at the University of New Hampshire.

Between 1979 and 2013 he directed the graduate program in photography at the Yale School of Art, where his students included Philip-Lorca diCorcia, Lois Conner, Abelardo Morell, Susan Lipper, Gregory Crewdson, An-My Le, Anna Gaskell, Steve Giovinco, and Katy Grannan.

In 2007, Steidl published Passing through Eden, a collection of photographs Papageorge took over 25 years in Central Park. Also in 2007, Aperture published American Sports, 1970: Or How We Spent the War in Vietnam, containing photographs taken during his 1970 Guggenheim Fellowship.

Books
Passing through Eden. Göttingen: Steidl, 2007. .
American Sports, 1970: Or How We Spent the War in Vietnam. New York: Aperture, 2007. .
Opera Città. Rome: Punctum, 2010. .
Core Curriculum: Writings on Photography. New York: Aperture, 2011. .
Studio 54.
London: Stanley Barker, 2014. . First edition.
London: Stanley Barker, 2014. . Second edition.
Dr Blankman's New York. Göttingen: Steidl, 2017.
On the Acropolis. London: Stanley Barker, 2019. .

Exhibitions
2013: Studio 54, Paris Photo, Paris, 25 January–12 April 2014.

References

External links 
Tod Papageorge's essay "Walker Evans and Robert Frank: An Essay on Influence"
New York magazine article about Papageorge from 2007

1940 births
Living people
People from Portsmouth, New Hampshire
American photographers
University of New Hampshire alumni
Yale School of Art faculty
Street photographers